A  is a ROM cartridge developed by Hudson Soft as a software distribution medium for MSX computers. Bee Cards are approximately the size of a credit card, but thicker. Compared to most game cartridges, the Bee Card is small and compact. Bee Cards were released in Japan and in Europe, but not in North America because the MSX was unsuccessful in North America. However, Atari Corporation adopted the Bee Card for the Atari Portfolio, a handheld PC released in 1989 in North America. Bee Cards were also used by some Korg Synthesizers and workstations as external storage of user content like sound programs or song data. Even though these systems all use Bee Cards, they are incompatible with each other.

Only a small number of MSX software titles were published on Bee Card: 6 in Japan, and only two in Europe and Italy. In order to accept a Bee Card, the cartridge slot of the MSX had to be fitted with a removable adapter: the Hudson Soft BeePack. The first mass-produced Bee Cards, however, were EEPROM telephone cards manufactured by Mitsubishi Plastics; these were first sold in Japan in 1985. The trade names Bee Card and Bee Pack derive from Hudson Soft's corporate logo, which features a cartoon bee.

MSX software published on Bee Card

Hudson Soft and other software publishers distributed at least eleven MSX software titles on Bee Card:

HuCard

Hudson Soft later collaborated with NEC to develop a video game console called the PC Engine. The companies elected to use Hudson Soft's slim ROM cartridge technology to distribute PC Engine software. Hudson Soft adapted the design for their needs, and produced the HuCard. HuCards are slightly thicker than Bee Cards; also, whereas a Bee Card has 32 pins, a HuCard has 38.

References

Computer-related introductions in 1985
MSX
Solid-state computer storage media
Konami